Wilsey may refer to:

People 
Dede Wilsey (born 1944), American socialite and philanthropist
James Calvin Wilsey (contemporary, 1957–2018), American punk-rock guitarist
Jay Wilsey (1896–1961), American film actor
John Wilsey (born 1939), British army officer; Commander-in-Chief, Land Command 1993–96
Sean Wilsey (born 1970), American author and editor
 Frank Wilsey, a member of the Sea Hags
 Shannon Michelle Wilsey, the actress Savannah

Places 
Wilsey, Kansas, United States
RHS Garden, Wisley
Wisley, Surrey